Khanpur  is a village in Kapurthala district of Punjab State, India. The village is administrated by a Sarpanch who is an elected representative of village as per the constitution of India and Panchayati raj (India).

Demography 
According to the report published by Census India in 2011, Khanpur has 223 houses with the total population of 1,154 persons of which 609 are male and 545 females. Literacy rate of  Khanpur is 69.11%, lower than the state average of 75.84%.  The population of children in the age group 0–6 years is 144 which is 12.48% of the total population.  Child sex ratio is approximately 946, higher than the state average of 846.

Population data

References

External links
  Villages in Kapurthala
 Kapurthala Villages List

Villages in Kapurthala district